is a tactical role-playing game by Flight-Plan for the Sony PlayStation 2 system. It is the second self-published game by Flight-Plan after 2007's Dragon Shadow Spell. In Sacred Blaze, the player assumes the role of God and has the ability to bestow various player characters with abilities to use in combat.

Reception
Sacred Blaze was given a 31 out of 40 by Famitsu magazine. It was the 8th best-selling game in Japan during its release week at 18,000 copies.

References

External links
Official website 
Sacred Blaze at Flight-Plan 

2009 video games
Flight-Plan games
Japan-exclusive video games
PlayStation 2 games
PlayStation 2-only games
Single-player video games
Tactical role-playing video games
Video games developed in Japan